Transverse aeolian ridges (TARs) are visually bright features commonly found in topographic depressions on Mars. These small-scale and relict bedforms were first seen in narrow-angle images from the Mars Orbiter Camera (MOC) and were called “ridges” to preserve both dunes and ripples as formative mechanisms. While TARs are widespread on Mars, their formation, age, composition, and role in past Martian sediment cycles remain poorly constrained.

Aeolian bedforms 
Aeolian bedforms are typically classified into either ripples or dunes based on their morphologies and formative mechanisms. Dunes are larger (>0.5 m or taller on Earth), typically asymmetrical in cross-profile, and are the product of hydrodynamic instability related to sand flux, the local topography, shear stress exerted by the wind on sand grains, and flow-form interactions induced by the topography of the dune itself. Wind ripples by comparison are small (amplitudes of 0.6 - 15 mm), are more symmetrical in profile, and are created by saltating and reptating sand grains that tend for form a regular pattern of impact and shadow zones.

On Mars, TARs represent some intermediate form with characteristics of both ripples and dunes. TARs are typically symmetrical in profile similar to wind ripples. However, TARs are several orders of magnitude larger than wind ripples observed on Mars or Earth. TARs are much smaller than Martian dunes, do not have slip-faces, and do not have the characteristic dune stoss and leeslopes. Furthermore, while TARs and dunes have approximately basaltic signatures on Mars, TARs have lower thermal inertias than dunes, indicating that TARs on their surfaces are composed of smaller particles than dunes. Some features on Earth have been proposed as proxies for TARs: gravel megaripples in Argentina, megaripples in Iran and Libya, and reversing dunes in Idaho, but an exact analog remains elusive.

Morphologies 
TARs also exhibit a range of morphologies, which are interpreted as representing different formative and evolutionary processes. Past efforts have been made to categorize TAR with classification systems primarily focusing on crest morphology.

*Established in the literature but not recognized as a distinct morphology

Formation 
There are competing hypotheses for TAR formation. Granule ripples covered by a monolayer of coarse millimeter-sized particles have been proposed for smaller TARs (amplitude <1 m), while dust-covered reversing dunes have been proposed for TARs >1 m in amplitude.

Past climate 
Understanding TAR formation and evolution could offer insight into the winds that created them. In turn, these inferences could have further insights into past wind patterns, atmospheric compositions, and climatic dynamics generally on Mars. Relict aeolian features exist on Earth and are useful records of local and atmospheric conditions, but the rapid erosion rates on Earth erase aeolian features older than the approximately the Last Glacial Maximum. Resurfacing rates are much slower on Mars so TARs could preserve conditions considerably further back in the Martian past.

Current activity 
A 2020 study found evidence that some isolated TARs could still be minimally active (i.e. ridge crests that are moving or changing), but the literature suggests that the majority of TARs are immobile. For example, dunes have been observed passing over TARs with no change to the underlying TARs after the dune's passing.

Images of TARs

See also 

 Dunes
 Ripples
 Mars
 Aeolian processes
 Aeolian landforms

References 

Aeolian landforms
Surface features of Mars